Thomas Ahrens (born 27 May 1948) is a retired German coxswain who was most successful in the eights. In this event he won a silver medal at the 1964 Summer Olympics, a world title in 1962, and two European titles in 1963 and 1964.

References

1948 births
Living people
People from Mölln, Schleswig-Holstein
West German male rowers
Coxswains (rowing)
Sportspeople from Schleswig-Holstein
Olympic rowers of the United Team of Germany
Rowers at the 1964 Summer Olympics
Olympic silver medalists for the United Team of Germany
Olympic medalists in rowing
World Rowing Championships medalists for West Germany
Medalists at the 1964 Summer Olympics
Recipients of the Silver Laurel Leaf
European Rowing Championships medalists